This article is a list of in-memory database system software.

References

In memory
Databases in memory